Tournai, was a possible former constituency of the Parliament of England.

Overview
Tournai, the only town (now city) in modern Belgium ever to have been ruled by England, was under English control from around 23 September 1513  (after its capture from France during the 1513 Battle of Guinegate) and remained so until its return in 1519 to France upon the payment of 600,000 crowns following the Treaty of London (1518). Aged 22, Henry VIII entered the town ceremonially on 25 September 1513. During part of the time during which the town was under English sovereignty, it was possibly represented in the Parliament of England by two Members of Parliament. However, Oxford historian C. S. L. Davies has argued that no such constituency ever existed.

Election
An election is believed by some to have taken place in about December 1513.

Members of Parliament

Coinage

Groat and half-groat coins were issued without a portrait of King Henry VIII but did display his name. Dated 1513, these were struck subsequent to the town's capture in 1513 from France and nowadays are exceptionally rare especially since they are the earliest British dated coins.

External links
 History Today article on Henry VIII in Tournai

References

 The House of Commons 1509-1558, by S.T. Bindoff (Secker & Warburg 1982)

1513 establishments in England
Constituencies in the Parliament of England
Political history of Belgium
1519 disestablishments in England
Politics of Wallonia
1510s in the Habsburg Netherlands
History of Tournai
Constituencies established in 1513
Constituencies disestablished in 1519